The Dexter Universalist Church, at Brown and Kirby Sts. in Dexter, New York, is a well-preserved, "modest" Greek Revival-style church that was built in 1841.  In a 2002 review of the church, then vacant, it was deemed to retain "a substantial degree of historic integrity with its original form, fabric, and fenestration intact."  It has leaded stained glass windows.  The church played a role in its community for over 100 years.

The building was listed on the National Register of Historic Places in 2003.

In 2013 is currently used as a museum by the Dexter Historical Society.

References

Churches on the National Register of Historic Places in New York (state)
Greek Revival church buildings in New York (state)
Churches completed in 1841
19th-century Unitarian Universalist church buildings
Churches in Jefferson County, New York
National Register of Historic Places in Jefferson County, New York